São Carlos Clube, is a sports club from São Carlos in São Paulo state, Brazil.

O Clube (Portuguese for The Club) as it is known locally was founded on January 9, 1944. Their soccer team plays in blue and white uniforms.

History 
The club was founded on January 9, 1944, with the merger between the tennis club São Carlos Tênis Clube (founded in 1920) and he football club Clube Comercial (founded in 1936). the team entered professional football in 1965, after the local representative of the city in the Campeonato Paulista, Clube Atlético Bandeirantes closed down. the team reached the Second level of the Paulista championship before abandoning professional football in 1970. The club was also notable as a basketball club, and it continued to participate in official competitions in that sport until 1989.

Achievements 
 Campeonato Paulista Terceira Divisão (Third position and access for Second division): 1966

Stadium 

São Carlos Clube play their matches at Estádio Paulista located in downtown São Carlos, inaugurated in 1926. The stadium originally belonged to Paulista Esporte Clube, and was named after its owner. after Paulista merged with São carlos, São Carlos began to use the stadium. The stadium has a maximum capacity of 4,000 people.

Trivia 
 The club's mascot is an eagle.

External links 
 Official website

Association football clubs established in 1944
Football clubs in São Paulo (state)
São Carlos
1944 establishments in Brazil
Defunct football clubs in São Paulo (state)